The Democratic Party leadership election was held on 12 December 2004 for the 30-member of the 6th Central Committee of the Democratic Party in Hong Kong, including chairman and two vice-chairman posts. It was the first contested chairmanship election in the party's history. Legislative Council member and party's Vice-Chairman Lee Wing-tat defeated the Chan King-ming, succeeding Yeung Sum as the chairman of the party.

Eligibility
The Central Committee was elected by the party congress. All public office holders, including the members of the Legislative Council and District Councils, are eligible to vote in the party congress. Every 30 members can also elect a delegate who holds one vote in the congress.

Overview
Chairman Yeung Sum announced he would not seek for re-election after the party performed badly in the 2004 Hong Kong Legislative Council election in September.However,  Albert Ho Chun-yan said he was not keen to run for the chairmanship because he was busy working for other organisations, such as the Hong Kong Alliance in Support of Patriotic Democratic Movements in China, where he was the secretary. Chan King-ming, who was seen as a Reformist said a genuine contest for the leadership was necessary for the party's future.

Elections

Results
In the election on 12 December, Lee Wing-tat, the major figure in the mainstreamer faction defeated Chan King-ming from the Young Turks faction with 189 to 113 votes. Chan who was also a vice-chairman candidate and Albert Ho both got elected with 205 votes, higher than the third candidate Zachary Wong Wai-yin who only got 96 votes, being elected as the new two vice-chairmen.

The elected members of the 6th Central Committee are listed as following:
Chairman: Lee Wing-tat
Vice-Chairmen: Albert Ho, Chan King-ming
Secretary: Cheung Yin-tung
Treasurer: Tsui Hon-kwong
Executive Committee Members:

 Chan Ka-wai
 Josephine Chan Shu-ying
 Gary Fan Kwok-wai
 Fung Wai-kwong
 Howard Lam Tsz-kin
 Law Chi-kwong
 Ng Wing-fai
 Szeto Wah
 Wong Sing-chi
 Yeung Sum

Central Committee Members:

 Kwan Wing-yip
 Cosmas Kwong Kwok-chuen
 Law Chun-ngai
 Raymond Lee Wai-man
 Joanna Leung Suk-ching
 Mark Li Kin-yin
 Ng Kim-sing
 Sin Chung-kai
 Tik Chi-yuen
 James To Kun-sun
 Wong Suet-ying
 Zachary Wong Wai-yin
 Wu Chi-wai
 Yeung Sik-pik
 Yuen Bun-keung

Notes
1. Ng Kim-sing and Wong Chun-wai received the same number of votes so a by-election was held later, in which Ng was elected to the Central Committee.

References

Political party leadership elections in Hong Kong
Democratic Party (Hong Kong)
2004 in Hong Kong
2004 elections in China
Democratic Party (HK) leadership election